Gmina Wiśniowa may refer to either of the following rural administrative districts in Poland:
Gmina Wiśniowa, Lesser Poland Voivodeship
Gmina Wiśniowa, Subcarpathian Voivodeship